Milan Đuričić may refer to:

 Milan Đuričić (footballer, born 1945), Croatian football coach and former player
 Milan Đuričić (footballer, born 1961), Serbian football coach and former player. Coach Of Radnicki from Niš.